National Highway 56A or NH 56A starts at Chenhat (junction with NH 28) and ends at km 16 of NH 56 in Uttar Pradesh, India. The total length of the highway is 13 km and runs only in the state of Uttar Pradesh.

See also
 List of National Highways in India (by Highway Number)
 List of National Highways in India
 National Highways Development Project

References

56A
National highways in India (old numbering)